Terminal Velocity is a 1997 novel by Blanche McCrary Boyd, dealing with many lesbian-related issues in society.

1997 American novels
American LGBT novels
Novels with lesbian themes